John Patrick "Jack" Perconte (born August 31, 1954) is an American former professional baseball second baseman. Perconte played in Major League Baseball (MLB) from 1980 to 1986.

Career
At the age of 26, on September 13, 1980, he made his MLB debut with the Los Angeles Dodgers. His most productive seasons were with the Seattle Mariners during which he hit a combined .281 and stole 60 bases in 68 attempts.

In addition to his MLB career, Perconte has authored four books - “The Success Trail: Learn to Win with a Marathon Runner’s Mindset” "Creating a Season to Remember: The New Youth Sports Coaching Leadership Handbook"The Making of a Hitter- A Proven and Practical Step-by-Step Baseball Guide" and "Raising an Athlete- How to Instill Confidence, Build Skills and Inspire a Love of Sport". Jack turned to writing to further help athletes and parents have enjoyable baseball and sports’ experiences. Jack’s website gives advice on baseball. coaching and parenting. He has been a featured writer for Baseball the Magazine for 10 years. 

Perconte has run 15 marathons and continues to teach youth baseball and softball. A native of the Chicago area, as of 2019 Perconte lives in the nearby suburb of Lisle, Illinois.

Personal life
His uncle, Frank Perconte, was a soldier of Easy Company, 506th Parachute Infantry Regiment, 101st Airborne Division during the Second World War, and is portrayed in Band of Brothers.

References

External links
, or Retrosheet, or Pura Pelota
Jack Perconte's Baseball Coaching Tips
Personal website

1954 births
Living people
Albuquerque Dukes players
American expatriate baseball players in Canada
Baseball players from Illinois
Buffalo Bisons (minor league) players
Calgary Cannons players
Charleston Charlies players
Chicago White Sox players
Cleveland Indians players
Lodi Dodgers players
Los Angeles Dodgers players
Major League Baseball second basemen
Murray State Racers baseball players
People from Joliet, Illinois
San Antonio Dodgers players
Seattle Mariners players
Sportspeople from Joliet, Illinois
Tigres de Aragua players
American expatriate baseball players in Venezuela